Nesanel Hakohen Quinn (1910 – 7 February 2005) was a Haredi Jewish rabbi and educator.  He was connected with Yeshiva Torah Vodaas in Brooklyn, New York, for nearly 80 years, rising to menahel (director).

Biography
Quinn's parents, Zalman Pinchas and Devorah Miriam Quinn, were originally from Dvinsk, Latvia. After 10 years without children, they followed the advice of Rabbi Sholom Dovber Schneersohn and emigrated to the United States. There they had five children. Mrs. Quinn lived to the age of 111.

Quinn was a pupil at Yeshiva Torah Vodaas (the elementary school) and a student in the first class of Mesivta Torah Vodaath, founded by Rabbi Shraga Feivel Mendlowitz in 1926. Rabbi Mendlowitz is said to have remarked to Rabbi Elchonon Wasserman about Rabbi Quinn that "he is my greatest and closest talmid (student) in America".

Rabbi Quinn also learned under Rabbi Dovid Leibowitz, Rosh Yeshiva of Torah Vodaath. When Rabbi Leibowitz left to start his own yeshiva, Yeshivas Rabbeinu Yisrael Meir HaKohen, Rabbi Nesanel Quinn was given charge of Torah Vodaath, along with Rabbi Gedalia Schorr.

In 1965 Rabbi Quinn established, along with Rabbi Zelik Epstein, Camp Ohr Shraga, the successor to Rabbi Mendlowitz's Camp Mesivta, which was the home of many American Gedolim during the summer months.

He died on 7 February 2005 (28 Shevat 5765) and was buried in the Monsey cemetery.

References

External links
Rabbi Quinn's grave

1910 births
2005 deaths
American Orthodox rabbis
20th-century American rabbis
21st-century American rabbis